Tas on its own may refer to:

 Tas (series), science fiction novels by E.C. Eliott
 44M Tas, a WW2 medium/heavy tank from Hungary
 TAS – Transportes Aéreos Salvador, defunct Brazilian airline
 Tas, father of Lél (Lehel), one of the Seven chieftains of the Magyars

TAS, Tas, tas, or TAs may also refer to:

Places
Tasmania, Australia, an abbreviation
Tas-Anna, a rural locality in Neryuktyayinsky 1-y Rural Okrug of Olyokminsky District in the Sakha Republic, Russia
Tas-Kystabyt, a mountain range in Far East Russia
Tas-Silġ, a rounded hilltop overlooking Marsaxlokk Bay, Malta, close to the city of Żejtun
River Tas, in Norfolk, England

People

Given name
Tas Baitieri (born 1958), Australian former rugby league footballer and coach
Tas Bull (1932–2003), Australian trade union leader 
Tas Pappas (born 1975), Australian skateboarder
Tas, father of Lél (Lehel), one of the Seven chieftains of the Magyars

Surname
Adam Tas (1668–1722), South African community leader
Adam Tas (singer) (born 1981), South African singer and songwriter in Afrikaans
András Róna-Tas (born 1931), Hungarian historian and linguist
Henk Tas (born 1948), Dutch visual artist and photographer  
Marcelo Tas (born 1959), Brazilian director, writer, actor and television host
Marja van der Tas (born 1958), Dutch politician 
Rudi Tas (born 1957), Flemish Belgian composer, conductor and organist

Nicknames
Nickname of Tasmiyah Janeesha Whitehead, arrested for the murder of Nikki Whitehead

Arts and entertainment
The Absolute Sound, an American audiophile magazine
Star Trek: The Animated Series
Tas (series), science fiction novels by E.C. Eliott
Tasslehoff Burrfoot, a character in Dragonlance novels

Education
Taipei American School, Taipei, Taiwan (Republic of China)
Tehran American School, Tehran, Iran
The Armidale School, New South Wales, Australia
The Associated Schools, a group of schools in Queensland, Australia
Trinity Anglican School, Cairns, Queensland, Australia

Military
44M Tas, a WW2 medium/heavy tank from Hungary
Tas-Samra Battery, a 1798–1800 artillery battery in Ħamrun, Malta
TAs, the Romanian designation of the German Sturmgeschütz III assault gun

Science and technology

Computing and telecommunications
Thermal-assisted switching, an approach to computer memory
Tool-assisted speedrun, in video games
Telephony application server, in telecommunications

Material science
Transient-absorption spectroscopy, a form of time-resolved spectroscopy
TAS classification, for types of volcanic rocks

Medicine
Transesophageal atrial stimulation
TAS-102, a cancer drug
TAS-108 or SR16234, a steroid hormone
Trent Accreditation Scheme, in UK healthcare

Other fields
Traffic Advisory System, for aircraft (e. g. TCAS)
True airspeed, of an aircraft
Total analysis system, chemical analysis technology
Neutron triple-axis spectrometry, a technique used in inelastic neutron scattering

Sports
TAS de Casablanca, a Moroccan football club
TAS Racing, a motorcycle team in Moneymore, County Londonderry, Northern Ireland
HK Taš, an ice hockey club in Belgrade, Serbia
Court of Arbitration for Sport, Lausanne, Switzerland

Transportation
Tashkent International Airport (IATA code: TAS), Uzbekistan
TAS – Transportes Aéreos Salvador
TasRail, a train operator owned by the Government of Tasmania
Tvornica Automobila Sarajevo, a former Yugoslav automobile manufacturer; see

Other uses
Taxpayer Advocate Service, United States
The Artists' Studio, a community theatre in Indiana, United States
The Atlas Society, an organization that promotes Objectivism, the philosophy of Ayn Rand
Travelers' Aid Society (spelled "Travellers" outside the US), a charitable organization

See also

Taz (disambiguation)